Nieuwe Wetering may refer to several places in the Netherlands:

 Nieuwe Wetering, in South Holland
 Nieuwe-Wetering, in Utrecht
 Nieuwe Wetering (Overijssel)